Atrichum angustatum is a species of mosses belonging to the family Polytrichaceae.

It is native to Eurasia and Northern America. It is rare in Iceland, being found at only two locations at is locally listed as a vulnerable species (VU).

References

Polytrichaceae